Il was king (Lugal) of the Sumerian city-state of Umma, circa 2400 BCE. His father was Eandamu, and his grandfather was King Enakalle, who had been vanquished by Eannatum of Lagash. Il was successor to Ur-Lumma. According to an inscription, before becoming king, he had been temple administrator in Zabalam: "At this time, Il, who was the temple administrator of Zabalam, marched in retreat from Girsu to Umma and took the governorship of Umma for himself." He ruled for at least 14 years.

He entered in a territorial conflict with Enmetena, ruler of Lagash, as mentioned in an inscription:

Il was defeated by Enmetena, who had sought the aid of Lugal-kinishe-dudu of Uruk, successor to Enshakushanna, who is in the king list.

Il later fought against Enannatum II, king of Lagash and successor to Enmetena, and vanquished him, ending the Lagash dynasty founded by Ur-Nanshe.

He was succeeded by his son, Gishakidu.

References

Kings of Umma
24th-century BC Sumerian kings